Edward Fulham D.D. (died 9 December 1694) was White's Professor of Moral Philosophy, Oxford University from 1633 and a Canon of Windsor from 1660 to 1694

Career

He was educated at Christ Church, Oxford and graduated BA in 1628, MA in 1631, BD in 1643 and DD in 1660.

He was appointed:
Professor of Moral Philosophy, Oxford University 1633
Rector of Wootton, Oxfordshire 1638
Chaplain to the British Factory in Livorno (during the English Civil War)
Prebendary of Ibthorne in Chichester Cathedral 1641 - 1682
Vicar of Bray, 1660
Rector of West Ilsley, Berkshire 1662
Prebendary of Lichfield 1673
Chaplain to King Charles II

He was appointed to the second stall in St George's Chapel, Windsor Castle in 1666, and held the stall until 1694.

Notes 

1694 deaths
Canons of Windsor
Academics of the University of Oxford
Alumni of Christ Church, Oxford
Year of birth missing
White's Professors of Moral Philosophy